Aminopeptidase Ey is an enzyme. This enzyme catalyses differs from other aminopeptidases in broad specificity for amino acids in the P1 position and the ability to hydrolyse peptides of four or five residues that contain Pro in the P1' position

This enzyme is zinc glycoprotein.

References

External links 
 

EC 3.4.11